Bhamidipati Kameswara Rao (1897–1958) was an Indian writer in the Telugu language, known for his humorous plays.
He was inspired by French writer Moliere, whose plays he adapted into Telugu. Bhamidipati became a trend setter in the field of humour play writing.
Bhamidipati not only translated some English farces into Telugu but also wrote original prahasanas (farces) in Telugu. His prahasanas are considered to be the best of type even today.

Early life 

Bhamidipati's father Narsavadhanulu was a Vedic scholar, but Bhamidipati developed love for literature at young age. In that era many theatre organisations competed for awards in Parishat competitions in verse drama. Bhamidipati, belonging to a poor family was one of the Parishat's beneficiaries. That helped him to get through his graduation. "Drama stood by me and hence I shall do something for drama" was his motto and he began writing plays especially for students.

Though he joined the government service, economic and family conditions forced him to take up a job as teacher at Rajahmundry. Bhamidipati did his M.A in Mathematics and retired as head master of Veeresalingam High School, Rajuhmundry.

He was in the company of great scholars, including legendary literary figures like Madhunapantula Satyanarayana, Chilakamarthi Lakshmi Narasimham, Sripada Krishnamurthy Sastry and Kasi Krishnamacharyulu. But the influence of Raghupathi Venkataratnam Naidu was more. Yet, Bhamidipati was a great fan of English plays and literature. His professor Cooldre's observation that ‘poetry and music were not different’ made Bhamidipati sit and think. He began researching into various works that resulted in his writing of Andhra Padyanataka Pathanam.

Works 

Bhamidipati Kameswararao Rachanalu-Vol.1 (Subject: HUMOUR - SATIRE,Year of Publication: 2008)
Bhamidipati Kameswararao Rachanalu-2 (Subject: ESSAYS - ANTHOLOGY, Year of Publication: 2010)
Bhamidipati Kameswara Rao Rachanalu-4 (Subject: PLAYS, Year of Publication: 2011)
Prahasanaalu( Subject: PLAYS,Year of Publication: 2012) 
Thyagaraja Atmavicaram,1949
Bataa khani

Book on Bhamidipati 

Sahitya Akedemi commissioned Tallavajhula Patanjali Sastry(who is a noted short story writer and is also known for his works on tribal life and culture, theatre, cinema and music.) to write a book on Bhamidipati Kameswara Rao and the book was published recently.

In the book, Author Patanjali Sastry gave a detailed picture of the life led by Bhamidipati from 1897, his birth year, till he died in 1958.
Author Patanjali Sastry says that apparently Bhamidipati told his son Radhakrishna, who later became a film script writer; that he committed a mistake in adapting Moliere in his works and asked his son never to follow other's works if he wanted to leave his own impression on his work.
"Though he wrote comedies, he remained an introvert and never smiled even when some one cracked a joke," informs Patanjali Sastry.
Bhamidipati was greatly influenced by Gurajada Appa Rao’s works, especially for its modernity and use of spoken regional dialect.
Viswanatha Satyanarayana had declared that Bhamidipati was the first and greatest humor playwright ever. 
Jayapur Maharaja accorded him the title of ‘Hasya Brahma’.
Author Patanjali Sastry reveals how Bhamidipati never allowed his subject to be made as a film.

References

External links 

1897 births
1958 deaths
Telugu writers